The following are the list of candidates for this election:

List of elected MPs

Detailed results

References

Kerala